The X 100pre Tour was the second concert tour of the Puerto Rican rapper Bad Bunny, in support of his studio album X 100pre. It toured North America, Latin America and Europe in 61 dates and 6 legs, beginning in San Juan on March 8, 2019, and ending in Tampa on December 8, 2019. The tour was a box office success and was named among the most lucrative according to Pollstar, being at ranked at number sixteen on the list. Also, the tour receive positive reviews by the critics due to production and creativity.

Background 
The first dates were announced by the singer on his Facebook account on December 18, 2018, in which he presented 14 dates spread across the United States and three presentations in the Puerto Rican capital, of which a second date was later added in Miami. On January 21, 2019, three dates in Colombia were announced by Colboletos, specifically in Bogotá, Cali and Medellín. On January 24, 2019, the singer's participation in the French version of Lollapalooza is announced. On March 2, 2019, it was announced, through the Chilean event organizer Bizarro Live Entertainment, a unique concert in Santiago de Chile on September 6 of the same year. On April 9, 2019, he announced the second North American part of the tour, including 17 dates only in the United States, this part of the tour would be sponsored by Corona Estéreo Beach of Corona Extra. Then on April 11, 2019, a talent contest was announced for concerts in Colombia, where the three winners would be Bad Bunny's opening acts or opening acts for his time on Colombian soil. On April 30, 2019, the European leg of the tour was announced, which would begin on July 4 of the same year. On May 24, the expansion of the tour to the Barclays Center venue is announced. On May 28, 2019, the passage of the Puerto Rican through Colombia is cancelled, leaving the country without any of the three previously agreed dates. On July 25, 2019, a second date is announced in the Chilean capital, which would be agreed for September 4 of the same year. On August 8, 2019, a single date was announced in the Mexican city of Monterrey, while two weeks later it would announce an extension of the Mexican tour through Mexico City, San Luis Potosí and Tampico.

Special guests 

 J Balvin in March 8 in P FKN R San Juan
 Wisin y Yandel in March 8 en San Juan
 Becky G in March 8 San Juan and April 22 in Los Angeles.
 Arcángel in March 10 San Juan and June 15 in Santo Domingo
 Lunay in June 15 in Santo Domingo
 El Alfa El Jefe in March 10 in San Juan and June 15 in Santo Domingo
 Jhay cortez y Andrezz in September 7 in Santiago
 Cazzu in October 17 in Mexico City

Tour dates

Notes

References 

Bad Bunny concert tours
2019 concert tours